Oštiepok (Slovak; plural: oštiepky) is a traditional smoked sheep milk cheese made in Slovakia. Oštiepok is a protected trade name under the EU's protected geographical indication.

A similar cheese is made by Gorals under the name Oscypek. The cheeses differ in ingredients' ratios, cheesemaking process and the characteristics of the final products.

See also 
 Žinčica – drink made of sheep's milk whey
 Parenica – traditional Slovak cheese
 Slovak cuisine
 List of smoked foods
 List of stretch-cured cheeses

References 

Cow's-milk cheeses
Sheep's-milk cheeses
Smoked cheeses
Stretched-curd cheeses
Slovak cheeses